The third election to the Carmarthenshire County Council in Wales was held in May 2004. It was preceded by the 1999 election and followed by the 2008 election. As in previous elections, the Independent councillors had the largest number of seats. They resulted in a coalition between Independent and Labour Councillors for the next four years.

Overview

|}

Results

Abergwili (one seat)

Ammanford (one seat)

Betws (one seat)

Bigyn two seats)

Burry Port (two seats)

Bynea (one seat)

Carmarthen Town North (two seats)

Carmarthen Town South (two seats)

Carmarthen Town West (two seats)

Cenarth (one seat)
The sitting Plaid Cymru councillor, John Crossley, chose to contest Llangeler and the party did not field a candidate, leading to the loss of the seat to the Independents.

Cilycwm (one seat)

Cynwyl Elfed (one seat)

Cynwyl Gaeo (one seat)

Dafen (one seat)
Tegwen Devichand was elected at a by-election following the death of the previous councillor, Vernon Warlow.

Elli (one seat)

Felinfoel (one seat)

Garnant (one seat)

Glanaman (one seat)

Glanymor (two seats)

Glyn (one seat)

Gorslas (two seats)

Hendy (one seat)
William James crossed the floor from Independents in the previous term.

Hengoed (two seats)

Kidwelly (one seat)
Although the sitting councillor, a former Labour member of Llanelli Borough Council, was elected as an Independent Labour candidate in 1995, he subsequently joined the Independent group.

Laugharne Township (one seat)

Llanboidy (one seat)

Llanddarog (one seat)
The elected candidate, who had sat as a Ratepayer for Gorslas since 1995, and on Dyfed County Council since 1977, had now joined the Independent group.

Llandeilo (one seat)

Llandovery Town (one seat)

Llandybie  (two seats)
Anthony Wyn Jones was elected at a by-election following the death of the previous Independent councillor, Gerald Earl.

Llanegwad (one seat)

Llanfihangel Aberbythych (one seat)

Llanfihangel-ar-Arth (one seat)

Llangadog  (one seat)
No Boundary Change. Ward named changed.

Llangeler (one seat)
The elected candidate was the sitting councillor for Cenarth since 1999.

Llangennech (two seats)

Llangunnor (one seat)

Llangyndeyrn (one seat)

Llannon (two seats)

Llansteffan (one seat)
Osi Rhys Osmond had been elected at a by-election following the death of the previous Independent councillor, Arthur Harries.

Llanybydder (one seat)

Lliedi (two seats)

Llwynhendy (two seats)
Dillwyn Bowen was the Labour councillor for Bynea from 1995 until de-selected by the Labour Party prior to the 2004 election. He then chose to contest Llwynhendy alongside sitting Independent councillor Don Davies, who had himself been de-selected by Labour prior to the 1999 election.

Manordeilo and Salem  (one seat)

Pembrey (two seats)

Penygroes (one seat)

Pontamman (one seat)

Pontyberem (one seat)
Joy Williams captured the seat for Plaid Cymru at a by-election following the death of the previous Independent Labour councillor, Ieuan Edwards.

Quarter Bach  (one seat)

St Clears (one seat)

St Ishmaels (one seat)

Saron (two seats)

Swiss Valley (one seat)

Trelech (one seat)

Trimsaran (one seat)

Tycroes (one seat)

Tyisha (two seats)

Whitland (one seat)

References

2004
2004 Welsh local elections
21st century in Carmarthenshire